Polina Denisovna Osipenko (8 October 1907 – 11 May 1939) was a Soviet military pilot, most notable as the co-pilot who, together with Valentina Grizodubova and Marina Raskova on September 24–25, 1938 performed a non-stop flight between Moscow and the Sea of Okhotsk, setting a new distance record for non-stop flights operated by women. For this achievement, she and her two colleagues were named Hero of the Soviet Union, the first three women to receive highest military distinction in Soviet Union on 2 November 1938.

Early life 
Osipenko was born as Polina Dudnik in 1907 in Novospasovka, Yekaterinoslav Governorate (currently Zaporizhzhia Oblast of Ukraine) to a Ukrainian peasant family and the ninth child born to her family. She worked at a collective farm until leaving for flight school in 1930. Between 1930 and 1933, Osipenko was a student at the Kazan Flight School.

Aviation career 

After graduating from flight school she subsequently served as military officer, flying a fighter. In 1937, she set three world records for altitude. In October 1937, Osipenko and Raskova set the women's flight distance record by flying from Moscow to Aktobe, and in July 1938, Osipenko, Vera Lomako, and Raskova set a new record by flying non-stop from Sevastopol to Arkhangelsk in a Beriev MP-1.

On 24 September, Grizodubova, Osipenko, and Raskova set on what was supposed to be a non-stop flight from Moscow to Komsomolsk-on-Amur in a Tupolev ANT-37. However, because the weather conditions were difficult, they missed the Komsomolsk airfield, and found themselves at the shore of the Sea of Okhotsk without any fuel left. Grizodubova, who was the pilot-in-command of the aircraft, decided to crash-land in the forest. Raskova was ordered to parachute out of the plane, forgetting her emergency kit; the remains of the aircraft were found by rescue crews eight days after the landing; Raskova found her way to the aircraft through the woods ten days after the crash where rescuers were waiting. Grizodubova and Osipenko remained in the aircraft during the landing and survived the crash. They still set the women's flight distance record and were awarded the titles of the Hero of the Soviet Union on 2 November 1938, and they were the only women to receive the title before the Second World War.

Osipenko was killed in 1939 with Anatoly Serov during a training flight.

See also

 List of female Heroes of the Soviet Union
 Valentina Grizodubova
 Marina Raskova

References

1907 births
1939 deaths
People from Zaporizhzhia Oblast
People from Mariupolsky Uyezd
Communist Party of the Soviet Union members
Soviet Air Force officers
Women aviators
Women air force personnel of the Soviet Union
Ukrainian women aviators
Soviet aviation record holders
Soviet women aviation record holders
Heroes of the Soviet Union
Recipients of the Order of Lenin
Victims of aviation accidents or incidents in the Soviet Union
Burials at the Kremlin Wall Necropolis